Ramiro Braian Luna (born 21 July 1995) is an Argentine professional footballer who plays as a winger for San Telmo, on loan from Ferrocarril Midland.

Career
Luna started his career with Leandro N. Alem in Primera D Metropolitana. He remained for six years, making one hundred and twenty-nine appearances and scoring fifteen times; including nine goals in sixty-nine matches in his final two seasons in Primera C Metropolitana; after promotion in 2016–17. July 2019 saw Luna join fellow fourth tier team Ferrocarril Midland. One goal in twenty-five games followed. In September 2020, Luna was signed on loan by Primera División side Arsenal de Sarandí. He made his top-flight debut on 14 November, featuring for sixty-seven minutes of an away win against Racing Club.

For Arsenal, Luna scored his first two top-flight goals on 3 January 2021 away against Independiente, after he came off the bench to net twice in the final seventeen minutes of a 4–3 victory in the Copa de la Liga Profesional.

In January 2022, Luna was loaned out to San Telmo until the end of 2022.

Career statistics
.

Notes

References

External links

1995 births
Living people
People from General Rodríguez Partido
Argentine footballers
Association football midfielders
Primera D Metropolitana players
Primera C Metropolitana players
Club Leandro N. Alem players
Club Ferrocarril Midland players
Arsenal de Sarandí footballers
San Telmo footballers
Sportspeople from Buenos Aires Province